Macarena Benvenuto (born 15 February 1988) is a Chilean alpine skier. She competed in the women's super-G at the 2006 Winter Olympics.

References

1988 births
Living people
Chilean female alpine skiers
Olympic alpine skiers of Chile
Alpine skiers at the 2006 Winter Olympics
Sportspeople from Santiago
21st-century Chilean women